Chimariko may refer to:
 Chimariko people, an indigenous people of California
 Chimariko language, an extinct language
 USS Chimariko (ATF-154), an American ship

Language and nationality disambiguation pages